Arani Srinivasulu (born 15 May), also known as Jangalapalli Srinivasulu and JMC, is a politician from the Indian state of Andhra Pradesh. He was elected as the Member of the Legislative Assembly (MLA) from Chittoor Assembly constituency in 2019 on behalf of the YSR Congress Party (YSRCP).

Early life 
Arani Srinivasulu was born to Arani Krishnaiah.

Political career 
Later he left PRP and joined TDP and had been appointed the president of its Chittoor district unit. In April 2014, he left TDP and joined YSRCP. He contested to Chittoor constituency in the 2014 Andhra Pradesh Legislative Assembly election on behalf of YSRCP but lost to TDP's . He again contested in the 2019 Andhra Pradesh Legislative Assembly election and won as the MLA.

References 

Living people
Year of birth missing (living people)
People from Chittoor district
Telugu people
Andhra Pradesh MLAs 2019–2024
Praja Rajyam Party politicians
Telugu Desam Party politicians
YSR Congress Party politicians